Heintze is a surname. Notable people with the surname include:

August Heintze (1881–1941), Swedish botanist
Horst Heintze (1927–1997), German politician
Jan Heintze (born 1963), Danish football player
Marion Heintze (born 1954), German chess master
Wilhelm Heintze (1849–1895), Swedish organist, music educator, and music conductor

Surnames from given names